Veeramangudi is a village in the Papanasam taluk of Thanjavur district, Tamil Nadu, India.

Demographics 

As per the 2001 census, Veeramangudi had a total population of 3025 with 1547 males and 1478 females. The sex ratio was 955. The literacy rate was 63.56.

References 

 

Villages in Thanjavur district